Philip Shaw is an Australian winemaker.

Early life and education 
Philip Shaw graduated from Roseworthy College in 1969.

Winemaking
Shaw began his career at Lindemans where he became head of production at Lindemans' Corowa winery. He later moved to Lindemans Karadoc Winery as general manager.

In 1982, he become chief winemaker at Rosemount Estate, and following the Rosemount Estate merger with Southcorp Wines in 2001, he became head of production for the group until 2003.

In 2004, Shaw moved to Orange, NSW as the interim CEO of Cumulus Wines, as well as to launch his new brand, Philip Shaw Wines. The first commercial release of the Philip Shaw Wines was in 2008. The Philip Shaw Cellar Door opened in 2014.

In 2015, Shaw established Hoosegg Wines using grapes from his Koomooloo Vineyard.

Awards
Shaw received the International Winemaker of the Year award at the International Wine and Spirit Competition in 1986 and 2000.

In 1999, he was awarded Qantas Gourmet Traveller WINE Magazine Winemaker of the Year and the 2000 Graham Gregory Trophy for his outstanding contribution to the Australian wine industry.

See also
 List of wine personalities

References

External links 
 

Living people
Australian winemakers
University of Adelaide alumni
Year of birth missing (living people)